Juan de Mena is a district of Cordillera Department in Paraguay. It is named after the Spanish Renaissance poet Juan de Mena, and is located 88 metres above sea level, surrounded by the lowlands of the Rivers Manduvira, Yhaguy, and Hondo.  General Lino Cesar Oviedo, military and politician, was born in this district.

Populated places in the Cordillera Department